Cigaritis nairobiensis is a butterfly in the family Lycaenidae. It is found in Kenya, Tanzania and the Democratic Republic of the Congo (Shaba).

The larvae feed on Rhus villosa.

References

Butterflies described in 1904
Cigaritis